The Drosten Stone is a carved Pictish stone of the 9th century at St Vigeans, near Arbroath, Scotland. In academic contexts it is sometimes called St Vigeans 1.

Inscription 

The Drosten Stone is a Class 2 cross-slab: a flat rectangular stone with a cross carved on one side and  symbols on the other. The stone is unusual in having a non-ogham inscription.

The inscription is read as:DROSTEN:IPEUORET[E]TTFORCUS
Thomas Owen Clancy has interpreted the text as Goidelic, giving Drosten, i ré Uoret ett Forcus (Drosten, in the time of Uoret, and Forcus). Clancy notes three possibilities for the origin of the stone. One is as a monument to a noble or ecclesiastic called Drosten, a common Pictish name related to Tristan, who died in the reign of Uoret and Fergus. The second possibility is a dedication to the popular Pictish Saint Drostan, or perhaps to Saints Drostan and Fergus. The final possibility noted by Clancy is that Drosten and Fergus had the stone made. Clancy believes the stone should be dated to the reign of the Pictish king Uurad (i.e. Uoret) (839–842), again, an unusual feature in that Pictish stones can rarely be so precisely dated.

Guto Rhys hypothesized that UORET may be a personal name, or a Pictish form of the Old Welsh noun guoret, meaning "protection".

References

External links
Proceedings of the Society of Antiquaries of Scotland at the Archaeology Data Service
CISP database entry (Celtic Inscribed Stones Project)
St Vigeans Museum details at the Historic Scotland website

Pictish stones
Pictish stones in Angus, Scotland